Tiina Irene Sten (born in Turku, 18 June 1985) is a Finnish basketball player, currently playing for TSV 1880 Wasserburg in the German Bundesliga. She is a 1.89 m power forward.

She is a member of the Finnish national team.

St. John's statistics 
Source

Career
 2003-2004  Turun Riento
 2004-2008  St. John's Red Storm
 2008-2009  CB Islas Canarias
 2009-2010  CDB Zaragoza
 2010-2011  Panionios GSS
 2011-2012  Sedis Bàsquet
 2012-  TSV 1880 Wasserburg

References

1985 births
Living people
Finnish expatriate basketball people in Germany
Finnish expatriate basketball people in Greece
Finnish expatriate basketball people in Spain
Finnish expatriate basketball people in the United States
Finnish women's basketball players
Power forwards (basketball)
Sportspeople from Turku
St. John's Red Storm women's basketball players
CB Islas Canarias players